Baron Pelham may refer to:

Thomas Pelham, 1st Baron Pelham (1653–1712)
Thomas Pelham-Holles, 1st Duke of Newcastle (1693–1768)
Thomas Pelham, 1st Earl of Chichester (1728–1805)